known in Europe as Nastar and in North America as Nastar Warrior (except for the North American Sega Genesis version, which was released as Rastan Saga II), is a hack and slash platform arcade game developed and released by Taito in 1988. It is the sequel to Rastan (released as Rastan Saga in Japan). The story in this game tells how Rastan got his titular name (meaning his real name is unknown) and saved a vast region called 'Rastania' from evil monsters known as "The Wicked Group". Rastania which Rastan saves in this game subsequently becomes a kingdom for Rastan to rule.

Gameplay
Rastan Saga II is a side scrolling hack-and-slash-em-up where the player takes the role of a barbarian who tries to defeat an evil wizard. The controls of Rastan consist of an eight-way joystick, a button for attacking, and a button for jumping. Like the first installment, the player is able to swing Rastan's sword in multiple directions. By using the joystick in combination with either button, the player can determine the height of Rastan's jumps.

There are a total six rounds, each consisting of two areas: an outdoor scene, and a castle hall where the player must confront the stage's boss. The backgrounds of the outdoor areas feature broad landscapes with changing sunlight effects with detail. The game's bosses include Medusa, a Gladiator Centaur, and the final boss, the evil wizard.

Reception 
In Japan, Game Machine listed Rastan Saga II on their May 15, 1989 issue as being the eighth most-successful table arcade unit of the month.

Notes

References

External links

Rastan Saga II at arcade-history
Nastar Warrior at arcade-history
Nastar at arcade-history
Rastan Saga II at MobyGames

1988 video games
Arcade video games
Platform games
Sega Genesis games
TurboGrafx-16 games
Video games scored by Hisayoshi Ogura
Virtual Console games
Taito arcade games
Taito B System games
Video games developed in Japan